Mako Yamashita (born December 31, 2002) is a Japanese figure skater. She is the 2018 Skate Canada silver medalist and a two-time medalist at the ISU Challenger Series. On the junior level, she is the 2018 World Junior bronze medalist, a four-time medalist on the ISU Junior Grand Prix series, and the 2017–18 Japanese junior national silver medalist.

Personal life 
Yamashita was born on 31 December 2002 in Nagoya, Japan.

Career

2016–2017 season 
Yamashita won two bronze medals at the ISU Junior Grand Prix series.

2017–2018 season 
In September 2017, Yamashita won the bronze medal at the ISU Junior Grand Prix in Salzburg, Austria behind Anastasia Tarakanova (Russia) and Lim Eun-soo (South Korea). She then won the silver medal at her next JGP event, held in Zagreb, Croatia, behind Sofia Samodurova (Russia).

In March 2018, Yamashita won the bronze medal at the 2018 World Junior Figure Skating Championships.

2018–2019 season: Senior debut 
In August 2018, Yamashita won the bronze medal at the 2018 CS Asian Trophy, behind Lim Eun-soo and Yuna Shiraiwa. In September, she also won the bronze medal at the 2018 CS Lombardia Trophy, behind Elizaveta Tuktamysheva and Sofia Samodurova.

In October, Yamashita debuted on the ISU Grand Prix series in the 2018–19 season. She won the silver medal at 2018 Skate Canada behind Elizaveta Tuktamysheva and ahead of Evgenia Medvedeva, the 2018 Olympic silver medalist. She then competed at 2018 Rostelecom Cup, where she placed seventh.

2019–2020 season 
Yamashita began the season with a sixth place at the 2019 CS Ondrej Nepela Memorial.  She finished twelfth out of twelve skaters at the 2019 Skate America. Yamashita fared better at the 2019 NHK Trophy, where she placed fifth.

At the 2019–20 Japanese Championships, Yamashita was fifth in the short program but dropped to eleventh place overall after finishing sixteenth in the free skate.

2020–2021 season 
Yamashita was invited to be a part of Team Red at the Japan Open after the withdrawal of Marin Honda.  Competing domestically, she placed sixth at Western Sectionals.

With the COVID-19 pandemic prompting the ISU to assign the Grand Prix based primarily on geographic location to limit international travel, Yamashita was assigned to compete at the 2020 NHK Trophy as part of a field of Japanese skaters and South Korea's You Young.  She placed third in the short program.  In the free skate, Yamashita attempted a quad Salchow in international competition for the first time, landing it with a full downgrade, as well as making errors on two other jumps.  She dropped to fifth place overall.

Yamashita placed thirteenth at the 2020–21 Japan Championships.

2021–2022 season 
Yamashita placed thirteenth for the second consecutive year at the 2021–22 Japan Championships.

2022–2023 season 
Yamashita placed sixteenth at the 2022–23 Japan Championships.

Programs

Competitive highlights 

GP: Grand Prix; CS: Challenger Series; JGP: Junior Grand Prix

2012–13 to 2015–16

Detailed results

Senior level

Junior level 

Small medals for short and free programs awarded only at ISU Championships.

Personal best highlighted in bold.

References

External links 
 

Living people
2002 births
Japanese female single skaters
Figure skaters from Nagoya
World Junior Figure Skating Championships medalists